José Antonio Gil Yepes is a Venezuelan sociologist and, since 1991, President of Caracas-based polling firm Datanálisis. He was professor at the Venezuelan business school Instituto de Estudios Superiores de Administración (IESA) from 1972 to 1990.

Background
After graduating in sociology from the Central University of Venezuela, Gil Yepes obtained a PhD in sociology and public administration from Northwestern University in the United States.

Career

Academia
Gil Yepes was professor at Instituto de Estudios Superiores de Administración (IESA) from 1972 to 1990. He also held positions at Pennsylvania State University, Andrés Bello Catholic University and Simón Bolívar University.

Business
Gil Yepes has been a director of a variety of companies, including Banco de Venezuela (when it was owned by Grupo Santander) and Chocolates El Rey. He was director of the Caracas Stock Exchange and Caracas Chamber of Commerce. He was a member of COPRE (the presidential commission on state reform) from 1985 to 1994. Since 1991, is President of Caracas-based polling firm Datanálisis.

Books
 Explorations is search of the definition and explicantes of left radical behavior among college students, 1970
 Development of radical identities in a social circle of white Northwestern University students, Northwestern University, 1974
 El reto de las élites, Tecnos, 1978, published in English as The challenge of Venezuelan democracy, New Brunswick: Transaction Books, 1981
 La centro democracia: El modelo de sociedad preferido por los venezolanos. El Nacional. 2009

References

Academic staff of Instituto de Estudios Superiores de Administración
Central University of Venezuela alumni
Northwestern University alumni
Living people
Year of birth missing (living people)